Xinzhen is a town in Xun County in northern Henan province, China, located around  southwest of county seat and  south-southeast of downtown Hebi. , it has 50 villages under its administration.

See also 
 List of township-level divisions of Henan

References 

Township-level divisions of Henan